Mohammad Shafiq Hamdam (Pashto: ډاکټر محمد شفیق همدم) is a writer, a leader in information technology and cybersecurity, and a political analyst from Afghanistan. He worked as a Deputy Senior Advisor to The President Islamic Republic of Afghanistan, a Senior Analyst/ Advisor to NATO and the Chairman of the Afghan Anti-Corruption Network (AACN).

Early life and education 
Hamdam was born in January 1981 in the Alishing village in Laghman Province of Afghanistan. In 1986 he enrolled in Lam-e-Shahid High School in Kabul. In 1999 he graduated from Shahid Muhammad Arif High School in Jalalabad. In the same year, he enrolled in the Political Science Faculty of Nangarhar Universitybut was forced by the Taliban to leave the University. In 2002 he earned his undergraduate in Health Sciences from the Nangarhar Institute of Health Sciences. In 2003 he rewarded Advance Diploma in Administration and Economics from The Swiss College of Administration and Economy. In 2010 he graduated from George C Marshall Center, European Center for Security Studies in Germany, where he studied advance security and international relations. He graduated from the Executive Program John F. Kennedy School of Government at Harvard University. He also earned a Master of National Security from The Institute of World Politics in Washington, DC. He is a Master of Engineering in Cybersecurity graduate at the School of Engineering and Applied Science at George Washington University. He is fluent in several languages, including Dari, Pashto, Urdu, and English.

Career history 
Hamdam works as a senior consultant for Deloitte, where he advises and assists a few Fortune 100 companies on cybersecurity and information technology. Before this, he worked as a Sr. Program Manager for the International Monetary Fund in Washington DC. Back in Afghanistan, he worked as a Deputy Senior Adviser to The President of the Islamic Republic of Afghanistan in international affairs at The Senior Advisory Office of The President on U.N. Affairs (SAOP UN-Affairs). The SAOP UN-Affairs worked on One U.N. for Afghanistan, a strategic framework that has replaced The United Nations Development Assistance Framework (UNDAF) for Afghanistan. The advisory also successfully drafted a mutual accountability framework between the government of Afghanistan and the United Nations. The One U.N. or Delivering As One (DAO) was one of the most challenging tasks for the U.N. family and the Afghan government, but the SAOP was able to do it successfully. Under the new framework, the U.N. has to align its programs and projects based on Afghanistan's national strategies and priorities.As a Senior Advisor and Senior Analyst, Hamdam closely worked with and advised senior NATO, the U.S. and international policymakers on political and development affairs of Afghanistan, South and Center Asia. He serves as the Chairman of Afghan Anti-Corruption Network (AACN), the largest and leading network of civil society organizations fighting against corruption.  He worked as subject matter expert for the University of Maryland, senior research fellow at Civil Vision International.  From 2008 to 2014 he worked as senior media, political and public diplomacy advisor to the NATO senior civilian representative in Afghanistan He was a Member of Board of Directors, Modern Organization for Development of Education (MODE), executive board chairman of Anti-Corruption Watch Organization. He is also the founder of Youth For Peace, Afghan Youth Against Corruption, Anti-Corruption Watch Organization, Kabul Tribune, an online newspaper and co-founder of the Afghan Women Coalition Against Corruption. Hamdam is a member of Afghan Young Leaders Friedrich-Ebert-Stiftung (FES), Program Associate of Hiroshima Peace Builders Center, a member of the United Nation Coalition Against Corruption (UNCAC), a member of Voice Against Corruption, a member of the Afghan Civil Society for Advocacy. In the 2009 presidential and provincial elections of Afghanistan he worked for Moby Media, Tolo T.V. as a presenter of political round-table during 2009 presidential elections. From 2003 to 2008 he worked with the Operation Enduring Freedom and Department of Defence as Media Coordinator and Spokesman, Culture/ Communication Adviser and Linguist. In the years 2002 and 2003 Hamdam worked as a Project Manager for the Demobilization Disarmament and Reintegration project of the United Nations in Kabul. Between 2001 and 2003 he was a freelancer interpreter and prior to that from 1998 to 2001 he worked as a Project Assistant with the Health Net International TPO and World Health Organization in Jalalabad city in eastern Afghanistan. The Asia Society recognized him as a 21 Young Asia Leaders.

Fighting corruption 

Hamdam said that corruption is the biggest problem, which feeds insecurity in Afghanistan as well as the insurgency, poppy cultivation, drug processing and drug trafficking. He formed the biggest ever group of volunteer social activists from across Afghanistan 
to fight corruption, the most dangerous and toughest job in one of the most corrupt and unstable country in the world. Through peaceful demonstrations and protests such a 5 km countrywide race against corruption, he mobilized thousands of citizens to pressure the government to reform, through 5 km race against corruption. He has also mobilized youth, students and women to take part in the fight against corruption. He is an outspoken activist, who has disclosed cases of senior corrupt official and he has advocated for the trail and persecution of cabinet members and senior politicians. Hamdam exposed land garbing, corruption of senior government officials and cabinet members. He has advocated for election transparency and reform.  He also played a key role in exposing Kabul Bank corruption, where near on billion USD was looted in corruption and resulted in the collapse of the bank.

Hamdam was a critic of Karzai government for not taking firm steps to fight corruption. In his interview with CBS TV he said that corruption starts from the street and goes to the palace and he called Karzai's government the most corrupt government ever. He has repeatedly called and pressured the Afghan government for fighting corruption and he looks at corruption as a major problem for the country. For his contribution to transparency, justice, peace and security of Afghanistan, he was nominated for 2013 Nobel Peace Prize by Combined Joint Interagency Task Force-Shafafiyat (NATO Transparency Task Forces).

Afghanistan's affairs 

Hamdam is closely following Afghanistan and regional countries' developments. Following Afghanistan's affairs as an observer, He has attended International Conference on Afghanistan, The Hague 2009 in the Netherlands, NATO 60 Summit in Strasburg and Kehl, France in 2009, Kabul International conference in 2010, NATO Summit in Lisbon Portugal in 2010, 2nd International Bonn Conference about Afghanistan, the NATO Chicago Summit in 2011  and tens of other national and international conferences on Afghanistan. As an observer he observed Afghanistan presidential elections in 2004 and 2009, Afghan parliamentary and provincial elections in 2005 and Traditional Loya Jirga on the Afghanistan and the U.S. Strategic Partnership Agreement.

Advocating for a closer relationship with the western allies, Hamdam played a key role in signing the Bilateral Security Agreement (BSA) between Afghanistan and US. Among other Afghan leaders and activists, he also signed the letter to President Obama advocating for the BSA and the letter said: We strongly echo the endorsement of the Bilateral Security Agreement last month at the Loya Jirga and reiterate that the agreement should be signed without delay. Our voice reflects a growing chorus from all segments of Afghan society, including our religious and business community leaders, who remain concerned about the future of our country and wish to see the expeditious finalization of the BSA.

Representing Afghanistan in the European Parliament, he advocates for peace, accountability, transparency and fighting corruption. He urged the leadership of the European Union, European Parliament and European Commission to support Afghans in the fight against corruption. He wrote in one of his articles to E.U. leaders: Afghanistan alone cannot reach its goal of reducing corruption; it requires the support of the international community. Without delay, serious actions should be taken to eliminate the problem. These actions should include empowering civil society organizations and the media to play a bigger role in the fight against corruption. If Afghanistan is to qualify for aid over the coming years, seriousness, strong commitment, political determination, and practical decisions will be needed in order to implement the laws and strategies required to overcome the problem of corruption in Afghanistan.

Hamdam was often criticized for his pro-Western opinions by some Afghan politicians and some anti-Western figures. He is seen as pro-West. As a Senior NATO Public Diplomacy Adviser, he has often defended NATO policies and by extremists, he is seen as a NATO-backed activist. Hamdam has defended many occasions NATO's positions and he has advocated for Afghanistan to become a NATO member. He was widely criticized by Muslim extremists and regional actors for his article, where he clearly stated that Afghanistan should be a NATO member. After completion of ISAF mission, he advised in one of his articles that "Afghan government and NATO should be able to enter a new, comprehensive, closer, stronger and mutual relationship. It should be based on mutual commitment and long-term cooperation with full respect for the sovereignty of Afghanistan. The relation which can possibly make Afghanistan a NATO member country in the future."  While some analysts called the ISAF mission as a failure, but Hamdam called that a historic and major success.

As a writer 

He writes for The Huffington Post and many leading Afghan papers and journals on political, security and foreign affairs. Talking about the corruption related issues and Afghanistan's affairs he has been appearing in numbers of national and International media outlets, such as Tolo News TV, Khaama Press News Agency, RFE/RL, BBC, CBS, AFP, ARD, VOA, TRT TV, Aljazeera TV, The Washington Post and other key national and international media outlets.

He is optimistic about Afghanistan. After the end of one decade ISAF mission in Afghanistan, he wrote on the Khaama Press that Afghanistan of 2001 is not comparable with Afghanistan of 2015. With 352,000 strong Afghan National Security Forces, backed by the U.S. and NATO, an increasingly vibrant civil society sector, and a large youth population, Afghans are hopeful that their country will never return to the dark era. For this to remain effective, Afghanistan and its partners must continue to broaden those achievements over the next decade, ushering in a new era of transformation.

Hamdam looks at democracy as a new phenomenon in Afghanistan and emphasizes on reform and fighting corruption. He wrote in Unipath is a professional military magazine published quarterly by the Commander of the United States Central Command as an international forum for military personnel in the Middle East and Central Asia region:  Governments and institutions work differently in democratic societies. He claims that it is not only fighting terrorism and extremists, but good governance that is a key priority for Afghanistan. He sees the weak rule of law and the existence of "impunity circles" and safe havens for corrupt individuals and officials in Afghanistan and abroad as the main contributor to violations of human rights and injustice.

He believes that the Afghan and U.S. government were not able to define their relationship for more than a decade. Hamdam wrote in his opinion editorial, A Decade of Relations Without Definition, that the Afghan-U.S. relationship should not be only based on dying and killing for each other, but it should be based on social, economic and political interests as well. Numerous opportunities already exist to build that long-term and stable relationship. At the moment, some Afghans see the presence of the U.S. in Afghanistan as a world policing and a force against Al-Qaeda and the Taliban. Hamdam is advocating for peace in Afghanistan and he believes that only military means the war in Afghanistan can not end.  However, the Taliban repeatedly asked for the full U.S. troops withdrawal, but Hamdam wants the U.S. and NATO long term presence in Afghanistan.

References

Afghan writers
Living people
1981 births
Spokespersons
Afghan journalists
Pashtun people
Afghan democracy activists
Afghan human rights activists
Afghan Muslims
Civil rights activists
Community activists
Afghan scientists
Linguists from Afghanistan
Anti-war activists
Anti-corruption activists
21st-century Afghan writers
Children's rights activists
Education activists
Shooting survivors
Victims of the Taliban
Nangarhar University alumni
People from Laghman Province
Harvard Kennedy School alumni
NATO Defense College alumni
Harvard University alumni
Muslim writers
International Security Assistance Force